Branko Ružić may refer to:
 Branko Ružić (sculptor) (1919–1997), Croatian sculptor
 Branko Ružić (politician) (born 1975), Serbian politician